Nemapogon fungivorella is a moth of the family Tineidae. It is found in Denmark, Germany, Poland, Austria, the Czech Republic, Slovakia, Norway, Sweden, Finland, Estonia, Latvia, Ukraine and Russia.

The wingspan is 12–20 mm. Adults have been recorded on wing in January and from July to August.

The larvae feed on fungi growing on rotting wood, including Daedalea quercina.

References

Moths described in 1939
Nemapogoninae